was a Japanese actor. He is most famous for playing the role of Daikichi Okakura on the television drama series Wataru Seken wa Oni Bakari.

Fujioka attended Kwansei Gakuin University but dropped out because of illness. His first starring role in the film was in the Gambare Nihondanji.

He died of chronic kidney disease on 20 October 2006 at the age of 76. His final film appearance was in The Blooming Again , released in 2004.

Filmography

Films
 Zatoichi and the Chess Expert (1965) as Sunpachi
 Gamera vs. Barugon (1966) as Doctor.Satō
 Yakuza (893) gurentai (1966)
 Zatoichi the Outlaw (1967) as Zatō Sanji
 Freshman Wakadaishō (1969) as Fujiwara
 Kaoyaku (1971) as Kurihara
 New Battles Without Honor and Humanity: Last Days of the Boss (1974) as Yonemoto
 The Gate of Youth (1975) as Owner
 Yakuza Graveyard (1976) as Sugi
 Mount Hakkoda (1977) as Monma
 Yatsuhakamura (1977) as Doctor.Hisano
 The Fall of Ako Castle (1978) as Ōno Kurobei
 Moonlight Mask (1981) as Detective Matsuda
 Imperial Navy (1981) as Shigeru Fukudome
 The Highest Honor (1982) as Matsumoto
 Tora-san's Song of Love (1983) as Kitamura
 Urusei Yatsura 2: Beautiful Dreamer (1984) as Mujyaki (voice)
 Ruten no umi (1990) as Chigusa
 Blooming Again (2004) as Kinzo Genda

Television drama
 Akō Rōshi (1964) as Sezaemon Oishi
 Momotarō-zamurai (1977) as Yonosuke
 Taiyō ni Hoero! (1973–86) Semi-regular as Kangorō Samejima
 Kasuga no Tsubone (1989) as Toyotomi Hideyoshi
 Wataru Seken wa Oni Bakari (1990–2005) as Daikichi Okakura

Japanese dub
 The Bad News Bears (1982 TV Asahi edition) as Morris Buttermaker (Walter Matthau)

References

External links
Takuya Fujioka NHK

Japanese male film actors
20th-century Japanese male actors
1930 births
2006 deaths